University of Seoul Law School is one of the professional graduate schools of University of Seoul, located in Seoul, South Korea. Founded in 2009, it is one of the founding law schools in South Korea and is one of the smaller schools with each class in the three-year J.D. program having approximately 50 students.

Programs
UOS Law specializes on tax law.

References

Website 
 Official Website

Law
Law schools in South Korea
Educational institutions established in 2009
2009 establishments in South Korea